Carbon tetroxide or Oxygen carbonate (in its C2v isomer) is a highly unstable oxide of carbon with formula .  It was proposed as an intermediate in the O-atom exchange between carbon dioxide and oxygen at high temperatures. The C2v isomer, which is 138 kJ mol−1 more stable than the D2d isomer, was first detected in electron-irradiated ices of carbon dioxide via infrared spectroscopy.

The isovalent carbon tetrasulfide CS4 is also known from inert gas matrix. It has D2d symmetry with the same atomic arrangement as CO4 (D2d).

References

Oxocarbons